Minoru Ozima  (born November 24, 1930, Yamagata City, Japan) is a geochemist and Professor Emeritus of the Department of Earth and Planetary Science, Graduate School of Science, at the University of Tokyo.
He was named one of the top 100 Asian scientists for the year 2021 by Asian Scientist magazine.

Ozima was one of the first geochemists to recognize that the isotope geochemistry of the noble gases could provide key information about the formation and evolution of planets. A leader in this field, his work on the geochemistry and cosmochemistry of the noble gases has enabled researchers to understand processes of planetary and atmospheric formation of the early Solar System.

Education
Ozima graduated from the Geophysical Institute of the University of Tokyo in 1950.  He entered graduate school at the University of Toronto in Canada, where he worked with John Tuzo Wilson and Don Russell.  His Ph.D. work involved technical aspects of K-Ar dating. He later returned to the  University of Tokyo.

Research
Noble gases are not rare elements in the Sun or the Solar System generally but are extremely depleted on the planet Earth, with lighter elements being the most depleted. In the 1960s, it was generally assumed that the noble gases were unimportant in the formation and evolution of the Earth. In the 1970s, Ozima presented a novel theory, based on measurements of isotopes, that explained the formation of the Earth's atmosphere as the  result of a catastrophic degassing event on the Earth within ~100 million years of the Earth’s formation. Through this and subsequent work, Ozima has developed the only model of planetary formation to explain the fractionation patterns of the noble gases.  His work in noble gas geochemistry has enabled researchers to understand processes of planetary formation of the early Solar System.

Awards
Minoru Ozima became a Fellow of the Geochemical Society in 2000. He received the V. M. Goldschmidt Award, the highest honor given by the Geochemical Society, in 2010.  He is the second Japanese scientist to receive the award, following Ikuo Kushiro in  2001.

In 2020, Ozima received the Japan Academy Prize for his research on noble gas geochemistry and planetary evolution.
He was named one of the top 100 Asian scientists for the year 2021 by Asian Scientist magazine.

The minor planet or asteroid 473503 Minoruozima was discovered in 2011 by the Catalina Sky Survey at Mount Lemmon Observatory  and named in his honor.

Bibliography

Papers
Among his many publications, a number of papers have been noted as particularly important:

Books

References

1930 births
Living people
Japanese scientists
University of Tokyo alumni
Academic staff of the University of Tokyo
Japanese geochemists
Recipients of the V. M. Goldschmidt Award